Poqomchiʼ (Pokomchi: Poqomchiiʼ) is a Mayan language spoken by the Poqomchiʼ Maya of Guatemala, and is very closely related to Poqomam. Its two main dialects, eastern and western, were spoken by 90,000 or so people in the year 2000,  in Purulhá, Baja Verapaz, and in the following municipalities of Alta Verapaz: Santa Cruz Verapaz, San Cristóbal Verapaz, Tactic,
Tamahú and Tucurú. It is also the predominant language in the municipality of Chicamán (El Quiché), which borders Alta Verapaz.

Distribution
Poqomam is spoken in the following municipalities of Alta Verapaz, Baja Verapaz, and El Quiché departments (Variación Dialectal en Poqom, 2000).
Alta Verapaz
Panzós (in the community of San Vicente II)
La Tinta
Tucurú
Tamahú
Tactic
Santa Cruz Verapaz
San Cristóbal Verapaz
El Quiché
Chicamán (in the aldea of Belejú)
Baja Verapaz
Purulhá (in the community of Ribalcó)

Phonology

Consonants 

 In Western Poqomchi',  is non-existent and a glottalized  occurs in alteration.
  mainly exists among the western dialects.
  can be heard as a flap sound  when occurring word-medially.
 If a glottal sound precedes , it is then heard as a voiceless fricative .

Vowels 

Notes

References

External links 
Diccionario Pocomchi-Castellano y Castellano-Pocomchi de S. Cristobal Cahcoh
Vocabulario de la lengua Pocomam de Mita, includes Pokonchi of San Cristobal Cajcaj 
Doctrina christiana en Pocomchí (Escrita por Fr. Hippolito de Aguilera, Predicador, Cura de este Partido de el pocomchí) (other texts available at this site)
OLAC resources in and about the Poqomchiʼ language
Documental "Cultura Poqomchiʼ"

Agglutinative languages
Mayan languages
Mesoamerican languages
Languages of Guatemala